Andrew W. Goodell (born December 1, 1954) is an American politician who was elected to the New York State Assembly in 2010. He is a Republican.  Previously, Goodell was the County Executive of Chautauqua County, New York. Goodell represents the 150th Assembly District, which is numerically the last, and geographically the westernmost, of the 150 districts in the Assembly and, as of the 2012 redistricting, aligns with the boundaries of Chautauqua County.

Career
Goodell is the managing partner of the law firm of Goodell & Rankin. He has been practicing law since 1982 and was admitted to practice by the New York State Bar Association, The District of Columbia Bar and the  Virginia State Bar. His practice areas included Real Estate Law, Business Law, Corporate Law, Banking Law, Municipal Law and Litigation. Previously, he served as County Executive for eight years. Goodell announced his intentions to run against incumbent Democratic assemblyman William Parment in summer 2010. After Parment dropped his re-election bid, Democrats chose former county legislator and frequent candidate Nancy Bargar as Goodell's opponent, whom Goodell dispatched in the general election in November 2010.

Personal life
Goodell is a magna cum laude graduate of Cornell Law School, where he received the American Jurisprudence Award for Administrative Law and was a member of the Cornell Law Review. He also has a degree in political economics and mathematics from Williams College.

He is a member of the Goodell family, whose members also include former U.S. senator Charles Goodell and current National Football League commissioner Roger Goodell.

References

External links
New York State Assembly member website

1954 births
Living people
Republican Party members of the New York State Assembly
Cornell Law School alumni
Williams College alumni
People from Jamestown, New York
New York (state) lawyers
County executives in New York (state)
21st-century American politicians